John Merriman was an Anglican bishop in the second half of the sixteenth century.

An Englishman, he was Chaplain to Elizabeth I of England before his consecration as Bishop of Down and Connor on 19 January 1568. He died in post in 1572.

References

16th-century Anglican bishops in Ireland
Bishops of Down and Connor
1572 deaths
Year of birth unknown